Nemoria rubrifrontaria, the red-fronted emerald, is a species of moth in the family Geometridae (geometrid moths), in the superfamily Geometroidea (geometrid and swallowtail moths). The species was described by Alpheus Spring Packard in 1873. It is found in North America. 

The MONA or Hodges number for Nemoria rubrifrontaria is 7047.

The species has pink eggs. Larvae appear to mimic the leaves of sweet fern, and go through five instars.

References

Further reading
 Ross H. Arnett. (2000). American Insects: A Handbook of the Insects of America North of Mexico. CRC Press.
 Scoble, Malcolm J., ed. (1999). Geometrid Moths of the World: A Catalogue (Lepidoptera, Geometridae). 1016.

External links
Butterflies and Moths of North America
NCBI Taxonomy Browser, Nemoria rubrifrontaria

Geometrinae
Moths described in 1873
Moths of North America